To accelerate is to have acceleration: the rate of change of velocity of an object with respect to time.

Accelerate may also refer to:

Music
 "Accelerate" (Christina Aguilera song), a song from her album Liberation (2018)
 Accelerate (Jump5 album), a 2003 pop album
 Accelerate (Peter Andre album), a 2010 pop album
 Accelerate (R.E.M. album), a 2008 alternative rock album; also the title track

Other

 ACCELERATE, a leadership program for Indigenous creatives run by the Australia Council and British Council, 2009–2016
 Accelerate (horse), an American thoroughbred racehorse
 USS Accelerate (ARS-30), a salvage ship

See also
 Accelerationen, Waltz by Strauss
 Acceleration (disambiguation)
 Accelerator (disambiguation)